This is a list of honorary degree recipients from the University of Alberta.



A

B

C

D

E

F

G

H

I
 Alexander M Iakovlev LL.D. (1991)
 Alexis Ignatieff LL.D. (1972)
 Randall Eugene Ivany LL.D. (1981)

J

K

L

M

N

O

P

R

S

T

V

W

Y
 Rosalyn Yalow D.Sc. (1983)
 Dennis Kestall Yorath LL.D. (1974)
 James William Young LL.D. (1960)

Z
 Jiang Zehui LL.D. (2002)
 Margaret Zeidler LL.D. (1997)
 James Zimmerman LL.D. (1977)

References
 University of Alberta Past Honorary Degree Recipients

Alberta University
Canada education-related lists